Following the merger of several Urban District Councils (Rishton, Gt Harwood, Accrington, Church, Oswaldtwsitle) and the Parish of Altham there followed ward boundary changes to equalise the seats. 1979 was the first election on the new boundaries with an all out election.

Results

By ward

References

1979 English local elections
1979
1970s in Lancashire